The Environment Series Heads developed from the Environment Triptych portrait sculptures by Jon Edgar in 2006. His ongoing series of terracotta clay portraits celebrates those contributing to a sustainable future on Earth. The sculptor observes the sitter on a rotating chair, working over seven or eight hours building up the head on a wooden peg using small pieces of clay. One sitter accounted It is the most intense and prolonged physical scrutiny I have ever had from a friend. For hours on end.

Sitters
 Ronald Blythe 
 Sue Clifford
 Ted Green
 Angela King
 James Lovelock
 Caroline Lucas
 Richard Mabey
 Mary Midgley
 Gordon Murray
 Peter Randall-Page
 Chris Rapley
 Fiona Reynolds
 Philippa Scott
 Guy Singh-Watson
 Tim Smit

References

English sculpture
Environmental art
Portraits of historical figures
Terracotta sculptures